The 1999 Maine Black Bears football team represented the University of Maine in the 1999 NCAA Division I-AA football season. They played their home games at Alfond Stadium as a member of the Atlantic 10 Conference. They were led by seventh-year head coach Jack Cosgrove. The Black Bears finished the season 4–7, 3–5 in conference play, to finish tied for sixth in the Atlantic 10.

Previous season

The Black Bears finished the 1998 season with a record of 6–5, with a 3–5 mark in the Atlantic 10 Conference to finish in a tie for third place in the New England Division.

Schedule

References

Maine
Maine Black Bears football seasons
Maine Black Bears football